Jiujiang railway station is a railway station located in Jiujiang, Jiangxi province, eastern China.

The station serves the Beijing–Kowloon railway, Nanchang–Jiujiang intercity railway, Hefei–Jiujiang railway, Tongling–Jiujiang railway, and Jiujiang–Quzhou railway.

History
The station opened in 1996.

References

Railway stations in Jiangxi
Railway stations in China opened in 1996
Jiujiang
Stations on the Beijing–Kowloon Railway